David Ogden Nuffer (born February 28, 1952) is a Senior United States district judge of the United States District Court for the District of Utah.

Biography

Nuffer was born in 1952 in Portland, Oregon. He received a Bachelor of Arts degree, cum laude, from Brigham Young University (BYU) in 1975 and a Juris Doctor, cum laude, from the J. Reuben Clark Law School at (BYU) in 1978. He served in private practice from 1978 until 2002. He was formerly a United States magistrate judge of the United States District Court for the District of Utah. He served in a part-time capacity while remaining a practicing lawyer starting in 1995 and became full-time in 2003, serving until his elevation to District Judge in 2012. Since 2001 he has been an adjunct professor at BYU. He served as President of the Utah State Bar from 2000 to 2001.

Federal judicial service

On June 29, 2011, President Barack Obama nominated Nuffer to serve as a United States District Judge for the United States District Court for the District of Utah. He would replace Judge Dale A. Kimball who took senior status in 2009. The Senate Judiciary Committee held a hearing on his nomination on September 20, 2011 and reported it to the floor on October 13, 2011. On March 22, 2012, the Senate voted 96–2 to confirm Nuffer. He received his commission on March 23, 2012. He served as Chief Judge from 2014 to 2018. He assumed senior status on April 2, 2022.

On March 1, 2018, the District of Utah established a southern region serving the southern part of the state. In April 2019, Judge Nuffer moved to southern Utah, becoming the first district judge in Utah to reside off the Wasatch Front.   He has chambers in the  St. George.  The federal court leases offices and a courtroom there.

References

External links

1952 births
Living people
Brigham Young University alumni
Brigham Young University faculty
J. Reuben Clark Law School alumni
Judges of the United States District Court for the District of Utah
United States district court judges appointed by Barack Obama
United States magistrate judges
21st-century American judges